First Time! The Count Meets the Duke is an album by American pianists, composers and bandleaders Duke Ellington and Count Basie with their combined Orchestras recorded and released on the Columbia label in 1961.

On stereo releases of the album, Basie's band is featured on the left channel and Ellington's on the right.

Reception
The AllMusic review by  Scott Yanow awarded the album 4½ stars calling it "a very successful and surprisingly uncrowded encounter. On most selections Ellington and Basie both play piano (their interaction with each other is wonderful) and the arrangements allowed the stars from both bands to take turns soloing".

Track listing
All compositions by Duke Ellington except as indicated
 "Battle Royal" - 5:33
 "To You" (Thad Jones) - 3:53
 "Take the "A" Train (Billy Strayhorn) - 3:46
 "Corner Pocket" [a.k.a. "Until I Met You"] (Freddie Green, Donald Wolf) - 4:53
 "Wild Man" [a.k.a. "Wild Man Moore"] - 6:20
 "Segue in C" (Frank Wess) - 8:22
 "B D B" (Ellington, Strayhorn) - 4:43
 "Jumpin' at the Woodside" (Count Basie) - 3:09
1999 CD Reissue Bonus Tracks
 "One More Once" - 3:25
 "Take the "A" Train" [alternate take] (Strayhorn) - 5:50
 "Jumpin' at the Woodside" [alternate take] (Basie) - 3:14
 "B D B" [alternate take] (Ellington, Strayhorn) - 4:30
 "Blues in Hoss' Flat" (Basie, Frank Foster) - 3:13
 "Wild Man" [alternate take] - 5:55
 "Battle Royal" [alternate take] - 6:32
Recorded at 30th Street Studio, New York on July 6, 1961

Personnel
Duke Ellington, Count Basie – piano
Cat Anderson, Willie Cook, Eddie Mullens, Ray Nance, Sonny Cohn, Lennie Johnson, Thad Jones, Snooky Young - trumpet
Lou Blackburn, Lawrence Brown, Henry Coker, Quentin Jackson, Benny Powell - trombone
Juan Tizol - valve trombone and tambourine on Wild Man
Jimmy Hamilton - clarinet, tenor saxophone
Johnny Hodges - alto saxophone
Russell Procope, Marshal Royal - alto saxophone, clarinet
Frank Wess - alto saxophone, tenor saxophone, flute
Paul Gonsalves, Frank Foster, Budd Johnson - tenor saxophone
Harry Carney, Charlie Fowlkes - baritone saxophone
Freddie Green - guitar
Aaron Bell, Eddie Jones - bass
Sam Woodyard, Sonny Payne - drums

References

Columbia Records albums
Duke Ellington albums
Count Basie Orchestra albums
1961 albums
Albums recorded at CBS 30th Street Studio
Collaborative albums